Iosif Berman (January 17, 1892, Suceava – September 17, 1941) was a Romanian photographer and journalist during the interwar period.

Early life

From an early age, Berman became interested in photography and as a child he spent time in the company of the itinerant photographers of Suceava and Cernăuți. Before the age of 18, he moved to Bucharest, where he earned money to buy a camera. His first photos were published in 1913 in the  depicting the cholera lazaretto from Turtucaia. He continued working at the Adevărul and Dimineaţa newspapers, both of which were owned by left-wing activist Constantin Mille.

During World War I, he was a regiment photographer and he was able to take photos of the October Revolution in Odessa, but his photographic plates were confiscated, on turns, by the Whites and by the Bolsheviks. In 1918, he contributed to Realitatea Ilustrată with a set of photographs of the fleeing German Army. After his regiment was disbanded, he traveled to Novorossiysk, in the Caucasus, where he met Raisa, whom he married and with whom he had a daughter, Luiza.

Photojournalist

Between 1920 and 1923, he was a correspondent from Istanbul for the Romanian newspaper. After returning to Romania, he was a photographer for the major Romanian newspaper, taking photographs of the Royal Family.

His photographs were published in all the major Romanian newspapers of the time: Adevărul, Dimineaţa, Curentul, Realitatea ilustrată, România ilustrată, Ilustraţiunea română, Cuvântul liber,  and also in The New York Times and National Geographic, being a correspondent of the Associated Press and Scandinavian Newspaper Press.

Fascist era

In 1937, the Octavian Goga government closed down the left-wing newspapers for which he worked and his life's work, the boxes with the photographic plates from the archive of the Adevărul and Dimineaţa newspapers were confiscated. Nevertheless, he continued to work and to send photographs to The New York Times.

Following the advice of Romanian historian and later Prime Minister Nicolae Iorga, Berman began using a pseudonym, I. B. Urseanu, (which is a translation of his Jewish name) in order not to attract the attention of the antisemitic Iron Guard.

Nevertheless, in 1940, he was banned from continuing his work due to the Anti-Jewish laws which were enacted by the National Legionary State. Depressed, he soon died on September 17, 1941. According to his daughter, he succumbed to a renal disease for which he refused to get any treatment.

Legacy
After World War II, the communist government tried to use the photos for propaganda, but they were hardly propaganda material. According to a researcher at Museum of the Romanian Peasant, he presented a realist view of the village, with its poor, its gypsies, and its village idiot.

Nevertheless, the photos were rediscovered after the Romanian Revolution at the Museum of the Romanian Peasant, which also published a monography on him.

References

1892 births
1941 deaths
People from Suceava
Romanian Jews
Adevărul people
War photographers
Romanian photojournalists
Photographers from Bucharest
Romanian journalists
20th-century journalists